Nurabad Rural District may refer to:

 Nurabad Rural District (Isfahan Province)
 Nurabad Rural District (Kerman Province)
 Nurabad Rural District (Lorestan Province)